Johnny Hollow is a Canadian electronic music group formed in 2001 in Guelph, Ontario. The band is composed of singer Janine White, digital artist Vincent Marcone, cellist Kitty Thompson, and guitarist Steve Hiehn.

Johnny Hollow is a music/art collaboration between founding members Janine White & Vincent Marcone, known for weaving together cinematic songs and darkly beautiful imagery. Their unique brand of avant-garde pop blends organic instruments with electro-industrial sounds. Often featured is the haunting cello of contributing member Kitty Thompson. Always accompanied by intricate dark art, they fall into a niche that touches on steampunk and goth genres, while evading specific categorization. Over the years they have acquired an impressive legion of devoted fans who have supported several successful crowd-sourcing campaigns.

White is a classically-trained musician and composer who is also a critically acclaimed sound designer. Marcone (and his famed alter ego, My Pet Skeleton) is a Juno award-winning graphic artist who combines traditional and digital techniques to craft album covers, fairy tales, short films and music videos.

Johnny Hollow has produced 3 full-length albums: Johnny Hollow (2003), Dirty Hands (2008), and A Collection of Creatures (2014), and two EPs: Devil's Night (2010) and Old Gods of New Berlin (2018), along with a number of remixes. Their music has been featured on Lost Girl, On a Sunny Afternoon, and The Facts in the Case of Mister Hollow.

Founding of the band
Marcone, known for his wide range of digital artwork over almost a decade, launched his website My Pet Skeleton. White was asked by Marcone to design the sound effects. Meanwhile, White and Thompson were also experimenting in their recording studio. They had sessions as gig musicians, but these weren't satisfying enough for them. My Pet Skeleton quickly rose to the forefront of the web hall of fame. The trio were heavily encouraged by the overwhelmingly positive response of the web audience, and decided to form an alliance. Their first material was presented on the My Pet Skeleton website.

Debut
In March 2003, Johnny Hollow launched their own small teaser site to announce the release of their first self-produced full-length album. Within one month of the album's release, the band was invited to contribute their first single named 'Bag of Snow' to D-Side's sampler disc, to be in the company of artists like Martin Gore of Depeche Mode, Lisa Gerrard of Dead Can Dance, Robin Guthrie of the Cocteau Twins, Type O Negative, The Cramps and Goldfrapp, who all had a strong influence on the band.

Discography

Studio Albums 
Johnny Hollow (2003)
Dirty Hands (2008)
A Collection of Creatures (2014)

EPs 
Devils Night (2010)
Old Gods of New Berlin (2018)

Remixes 
Devil's Night Remixes (2014)
The Mongrel Mixes (2016)
Her Infinite Jest Alias One Ascendancy Remix (2020)
My Lovely Jinn - Alias One Let's burn Together Remix (2020)
Superhero - Dead Red Velvet Remix (2020)
The Wild Hunt - Isolation Mix (2020)
The Wild Hunt - The New Berlin Alias One Remix (2020)
Bogeyman Alias One Remix (2021)
I, Goblin Jonah K Red Pill Remix (2021)

Filmography
The Facts in the Case of Mister Hollow (2008, film soundtrack)

References

External links
 Johnny Hollow Official site
 Johnny Hollow discography (Bandcamp)
 Johnny Hollow Spotify
 My Pet Skeleton

Musical groups established in 2001
Musical groups from Guelph
Canadian electronic music groups
Canadian goth groups
Steampunk music
2001 establishments in Ontario